Expo '75 was a World's Fair held on the island of Okinawa in Japan from July 20, 1975, to January 18, 1976.

History 

Expo 75 was conceived, in part, to commemorate the American handover of Okinawa to Japan in 1972. The theme of the exposition was the oceans, and focused on oceanographic technologies, marine life, and oceanic cultures. The motto was “The sea we would like to see" (海－その望ましい未来, Umi - sono nozomashii mirai).

The event was located on the western end of the Motobu Peninsula, with a site area of 1,000,000 square metres (including sea areas). Thirty-seven nations participated, along with eight domestic and three international organizations. The keynote speaker on opening day was American author James A. Michener.

The exposition is the given reason for the construction of the Nakagusuku Hotel.

Expo 75 site 

The site was divided into four “Clusters” in which there were pavilions and exhibits:

Fish Cluster 
 Iran Pavilion
 Sumitomo Pavilion
 Aquarium
 Dolphin Land
 Expo Future Car (C.V.S.)

Peoples and History Cluster 
 International Pavilion No. 1
 Okinawa Pavilion
 EXPO Hall
 Hitachi Pavilion
 Oceanic Culture Museum — Audio-visual hall, planetarium and exhibition hall displaying ships, carvings, and other cultural items from the Pacific Ocean area.
 Mitsubishi Pavilion — Ride featuring underwater technologies
 International Pavilion No. 2

Science and Technology Cluster 
 World Ocean Systems (W.O.S) — Whale-shaped theater.
 Mistui Children’s Pavilion
 Fuyo Group Pavilion — Featuring oceanic robotics and aerial garden.
 U.S.A. Pavilion
 Aquapolis — Centerpiece floating city.
 Canada Pavilion
 Australia Pavilion
 Italy Pavilion
 U.S.S.R. Pavilion
 Expo New City Car (K.R.T.)

Ships Cluster 
 International Pavilion No. 3
 Midori/Icearama Pavilion – Iceberg-shaped building displaying a 3,000-year-old ice core, and a 12,000-year-old ice core.
 EXPO Port
 Guest House

There was also EXPO Port, EXPO Beach, and an amusement park named EXPO Land.

Highlights 
The centerpiece of Expo 75 was the Aquapolis a floating city designed by Japanese architect Kiyonori Kikutake. It was envisioned as a concept of how humans could live harmoniously on the ocean, and a prototype for marine communities. The Aquapolis was constructed at a shipyard in Hiroshima, Japan, and then towed to the Expo site. The facility was funded by the Japanese government, and cost 13 billion yen. It was thirty-two meters high, and had a one-hundred square meter deck.

The Expo Transit System featured two types of automated, electric transport vehicles: The "Expo New City Cars" (KRT) ran on a 3.7 km track almost the whole length of the site, there were three stations. The Expo Future Cars (CVS) track was at the north end and connected the Fish Cluster with Expo Land via five stations.

Post-Exposition 
After the Expo was over, the site became Okinawa Commemorative National Government Park (国営沖縄記念公園), also known as Ocean Expo Park. Most of the exhibits were removed, although the Aquapolis was retained as an attraction and eventually hosted four million visitors. As years passed, the number of visitors to the Aquapolis declined and it was closed in 1993. In October 2000, the Aquapolis was towed away to Shanghai to be scrapped.

After that, we continued to use the Aquarium facility used in Expo'75 and opened it as the Okinawa Ocean Expo Aquarium. The Okinawa Ocean Expo Aquarium was closed in 2002 due to aging and then reopened as Okinawa Churaumi Aquarium.

The Tropical & Subtropical Arboretum were later constructed on the site.

External links 
Official website of the BIE
Ocean Expo Park
Scrapping of the Aquapolis
Preparing Okinawa for Reversion to Japan: The Okinawa International Ocean Exposition of 1975, the US Military and the Construction State

World's fairs in Japan
1975 in Japan
History of Okinawa Prefecture